The Federation of Norwegian Industries (NI) was an employers' organisation in Norway. It existed between 1919 and 1989, and was one of the main organisations in the field. In 1989 it became a part of the Confederation of Norwegian Enterprise through a merger.

References

Conservatism in Norway